Cercopimorpha homopteridia is a moth of the subfamily Arctiinae. It was described by Arthur Gardiner Butler in 1876. It is found in Brazil.

References

External links
Original description: The Journal of the Linnean Society of London: 424.

Moths described in 1876
Arctiinae